The 75th Venice International Film Festival was held from 29 August to 8 September 2018. Mexican film director Guillermo del Toro was named as the President of the Jury. First Man, directed by Damien Chazelle, was selected to open the festival. Guillermo del Toro was named as the Jury President for the main competition section, with Michele Riondino hosting the festival.

The festival poster is made by Italian artist Lorenzo Mattotti, who designed it in the way "that attracts the eye, that attracts thought, but without revealing too much." The Golden Lion was awarded to Roma, directed by Alfonso Cuarón.

Jury
Main Competition (Venezia 75)
Guillermo del Toro, Mexican film director (Jury President)
Sylvia Chang, Taiwanese actress, writer, singer, producer and director
Trine Dyrholm, Danish actress, singer and songwriter
Nicole Garcia, French actress, film director and screenwriter
Paolo Genovese, Italian director and screenwriter
Małgorzata Szumowska, Polish film director, screenwriter and producer
Taika Waititi, New Zealand film director, screenwriter and actor
Christoph Waltz, Austrian actor
Naomi Watts, British actress

Official selection

In Competition
The following films were selected for the main international competition:

Highlighted title indicates Golden Lion winner.

Out of Competition
The following films were selected to be screened out of competition:

Horizons
The following films were selected for the Horizons (Orizzonti) section:

Highlighted titles indicate Horizons Prizes for Best Feature Film and Best Short Film respectively.

Venice Classics
The following films were selected to be screened in the Venice Classics section:

Highlighted titles indicate the Best Restored Film and Best Documentary on Cinema official awards respectively.

Sconfini
The following films were selected for the Sconfini section:

Awards

Official selection
The following official awards were presented at the 75th edition:

In Competition
Golden Lion: Roma by Alfonso Cuarón
Grand Jury Prize: The Favourite by Yorgos Lanthimos
Silver Lion: The Sisters Brothers by Jacques Audiard
Volpi Cup for Best Actress: Olivia Colman for The Favourite
Volpi Cup for Best Actor: Willem Dafoe for At Eternity's Gate
 Best Screenplay Award: The Ballad of Buster Scruggs by Joel and Ethan Coen
Special Jury Prize: The Nightingale by Jennifer Kent
Marcello Mastroianni Award: Baykali Ganambarr for The Nightingale

Horizons (Orizzonti)
Best Film: Manta Ray by Phuttiphong Aroonpheng
Best Director: The River by Emir Baigazin
Special Jury Prize: The Announcement by Mahmut Fazil Coşkun
Best Actress: Natalia Kudryashova for The Man Who Surprised Everyone
Best Actor: Kais Nashef for Tel Aviv On Fire
Best Screenplay: Jinpa by Pema Tseden
Horizons Prize for Best Short: A Gift by Aditya Ahmad

Lion of the Future
Luigi De Laurentiis Award for a Debut Film:  The Day I Lost My Shadow by Soudade Kaadan

Venezia Classici Awards
Best Documentary on Cinema: The Great Buster: A Celebration by Peter Bogdanovich
Best Restored Film: The Night of the Shooting Stars by Paolo Taviani and Vittorio Taviani

Special Awards
Golden Lion For Lifetime Achievement: David Cronenberg and Vanessa Redgrave

Autonomous sections
The following collateral awards were conferred to films of the autonomous sections:

Venice International Critics' Week
Sun Film Group Audience Award: Still Recording by Saeed Al Batal and Ghiath Ayoub
Verona Film Club Award: Blonde Animals by Maxime Matray and Alexia Walther
Mario Serandrei – Hotel Saturnia Award for the Best Technical Contribution: Still Recording by Saeed Al Batal and Ghiath Ayoub

Giornate degli Autori
 SIAE Award: Mario Martone for his artistic career and for his last picture, Capri-Revolution
 GdA Director's Award: Real Love by Claire Burger
 BNL People's Choice Award: Ricordi? by Valerio Mieli
 Europa Cinemas Label Award: Joy by Sudabeh Mortezai
 Hearst Film Award: Joy by Sudabeh Mortezai

Other collateral awards
The following collateral awards were conferred to films of the official selection:

 Arca CinemaGiovani Award
Best Italian Film: Capri-Revolution by Mario Martone
Venezia 75 Best Film: Never Look Away by Florian Henckel von Donnersmarck
 Brian Award: On My Skin by Alessio Cremonini (Horizons)
 Enrico Fulchignoni – CICT-UNESCO Award: El Pepe: Una Vida Suprema by Emir Kusturica (Out of competition)
 FEDIC (Federazione Italiana dei Cineclub) Award: On My Skin by Alessio Cremonini
Special mention: Ricordi? by Valerio Mieli (Giornate)
Mention FEDIC Il Giornale del Cibo: I villani by Daniele De Michele (Giornate)
 FIPRESCI Awards:
Best Film (main competition): Sunset by László Nemes
Best Film (other sections): Still Recording by Saeed Al Batal and Ghiath Ayoub (International Critics' Week)
 Gillo Pontecorvo Award (Best co-production for a debut film): The Road Not Taken by Tang Gaopeng
 Green Drop Award: At Eternity's Gate by Julian Schnabel
 Lanterna Magica Award (CGS): Amanda by Mikhael Hers (Horizons)
 Leoncino d'Oro Agiscuola per il Cinema Award: Never Look Away by Florian Henckel von Donnersmarck
Cinema for UNICEF Award: What You Gonna Do When the World's on Fire? by Roberto Minervini
 Queer Lion: Josè by Li Cheng (Giornate)
 SIGNIS Award: Roma by Alfonso Cuarón
Special mention: 22 July by Paul Greengrass
 C. Smithers Foundation Award – CICT-UNESCO: A Star Is Born by Bradley Cooper
Special mention: The Mountain by Rick Alverson
 Robert Bresson Award: Liliana Cavani
 Franca Sozzani Award: Salma Hayek
 Campari Passion for the Cinema Award: Bob Murawski for The Other Side of the Wind
Pietro Bianchi Award: Carlo Verdone
Fondazione Mimmo Rotella Award: Julian Schnabel and Willem Dafoe for At Eternity's Gate

References

External links
 

2018 film festivals
2018 in Italian cinema
August 2018 events in Italy
September 2018 events in Italy
74
Film